Óscar Hernández defeated Nicolás Lapentti 7–6(7–4), 6–4 in the final.

Seeds

Draw

Finals

Top half

Bottom half

External links
Main Draw
Qualifying Draw

2004 Singles